Phryganopteryx formosa is a moth in the subfamily Arctiinae. It was described by Hervé de Toulgoët in 1958. It is found on Madagascar.

References

Moths described in 1958
Taxa named by Hervé de Toulgoët
Phryganopterygina